The CANT Z.506 Airone (Italian: Heron) was a trimotor floatplane produced by CANT from 1935. It served as a transport and postal aircraft with the Italian airline "Ala Littoria". It established 10 world records in 1936 and another 10 in 1937. During World War II it was used as a reconnaissance aircraft, bomber and air-sea rescue plane, by the Italian Regia Aeronautica and Regia Marina, Aeronautica Cobelligerante del Sud, Aeronautica Nazionale Repubblicana and the Luftwaffe. The military version revealed itself to be one of the best floatplanes ever built. Despite its wooden structure it was able to operate in very rough seas. A number of Z.506S air-sea rescue aircraft remained in service until 1959.

Design and development
The CANT Z.506 was designed as a 12 to 14-seat transport twin-float floatplane, powered by three  Piaggio Stella P.IX radial engines. It was derived from the larger and heavier Z.505 seaplane. The Z.506 entered production in 1936 as the Z.506A, powered by more powerful  Alfa Romeo 126 RC.34 nine cylinder radial engines, giving a maximum output of 780 CV on takeoff and 750 CV at 3,400 meters. The fuselage had a wooden structure covered in tulipier wooden lamellas. The wings were built with a structure of three box-type spars linked by wooden wing-ribs covered by plywood. The armament consisted of a  Breda-SAFAT machine gun in the dorsal position and three  machine guns, one in the ventral position and two on the sides of the fuselage. The CANT Z.506 had a crew of five.

It was produced at the "Cantieri Riuniti dell 'Adriatico" and "Cantiere Navale Triestino" (CRDA CANT) factories in Monfalcone and Finale Ligure respectively. The aeroplanes were in such demand that the Piaggio company also produced CANT Z.506s. under licence. The Z.506A entered service with the Ala Littoria air company flying around the Mediterranean.

It subsequently flew  in a closed circuit.

A military version appeared after 15 civil aeroplanes had entered service with Ala Littoria. 
It was developed as the Z.506B. This military version was powered by three  Alfa Romeo 127 RC 55 engines and entered service in 1939. This version was also a record breaker. A larger version of the Z.506A was built in 1937 as the Z.509. The last CANT Z.506B was built by Piaggio in January 1943. Total production was more than 320 aircraft.

Operational history

The Airone saw more than 20 years of service.
The Z.506B was first used as a reconnaissance aircraft and torpedo bomber in the Spanish Civil War. When Italy entered the Second World War, on 10 June 1940, 97 aircraft were operational with two Stormi da Bombardamento Marittimo (sea bombing units) and some Squadriglia da Ricognizione Marittima. 31°Stormo B.M. "autonomo" with 22 planes was based at Cagliari-Elmas airport, in Sardinia; 35° Stormo B.M., with 25 Z.506 in Brindisi, Puglia. It was used extensively in 1940–41 in France and Greece. On the outbreak of World War II, four Squadriglie for air-sea rescue missions were formed in Orbetello. These were the 612ª in Stagnoni, with aircraft marked DAMB, GORO, BUIE, CANT (the prototype) and POLA, and the 614ª in Benghazi, with DUCO, ALA, DODO and DAIM. The two other sections with two aircraft each were based in Torre del Lago and in the Aegean Sea at Leros. The latter was later transferred to Rhodes.

The Z.506 saw its first action on 17 June 1940, the day after some French bombers had attacked Elmas base, killing 21 airmen and destroying some CANT Z.501s. On the evening of 17 June, four Z.506Bs from 31° Stormo attacked targets in French North Africa, each dropping two 250 kg and three 100 kg bombs. The type also took part in the Battle of Calabria. In the war against Greece it was used against coastal targets and the Corinth canal. It played an important part in the conquest of many Greek islands, including Corfu, Cephalonia and Zante. Due to its vulnerability against fighters, it was restricted to use by 'recce' units (Squadriglie da Ricognizione). Later in the war, it was used in maritime patrol and air-sea rescue missions. The Z.506 was often forced to land in Spain, due to engine failure, combat damage or a lack of fuel. A special air-sea rescue version, the Z.506S Soccorso, was produced; it was used in small numbers by the Luftwaffe.

The air-sea rescue Z.506s suffered severe losses as many Allied pilots did not stop attacking them, even after they had spotted the red crosses. For instance, on 12 June 1942, off Malta, a Hawker Hurricane from 46 Squadron shot down a Z.506, then shot another one down which had been sent to rescue the crew of the first. Sergeant Etchells, in 249 at Malta recalled:

A CANT Z.506 became famous, among the Allies, because it was the only plane hijacked by prisoners of war on the Western Front (it was then used by the RAF from Malta).
Occasionally the CANT Z.506s managed to shoot down the Allied aircraft that attacked them. On 7 January 1943, a "recce" seaplane from 188ª Squadriglia was attacked on the Mediterranean by two Bristol Blenheim. While pilot Maresciallo Ambrogio Serri headed for Sardinia, Armiere Pietro Bonannini with five bursts of shots from the 12.7 mm machine gun, managed to hit a first Blenheim, that ditched in the sea. Then, the second Blenheim closed on the CANT, strafing it. Bonannini was wounded but he managed to hit the enemy aircraft, that veered and fell overboard. Bonannini, during the war was awarded three  Medaglie d'Argento al Valore Militare and a Medaglia di bronzo al Valor Militare.

When Italy surrendered to the Allies, on 8 September 1943, about 70 CANT Z.506s were still in service with the Italian Air Force. About 30 surviving Z.506S were assimilated into Allied forces and served with the Italian Co-Belligerent Air Force. The Germans soon captured the Z.506s and started using them in Italy, Germany, France, Yugoslavia and even on Greek islands and in Poland.  The Cants of 171ª Squadriglia kept on operating air/sea rescue and patrol missions from the military port of Toulon, with mixed Italian/German crews. Some Z.506s captured by Germans, flown by Italian volunteer crews, operated in 1944 on the Baltic sea, patrolling the area around Peenemünde. Some examples survived in postwar service until 1959.

Variants
Z.506
Prototype, one built.
Z.506A
Civil version
Z.506B
Military version, 314 built.
Z.506C
Civil version, 38 built.
Z.506S
Air-sea rescue version
Z.506 Landplane
One aircraft was converted to a landplane for an attempt by Mario Stoppani on an endurance record. It did not take place due to bad weather.
Z.509
A larger and heavier version of the Z.506B, three built.

Operators

 Luftwaffe (captured)

 Ala Littoria
 Regia Aeronautica
 Regia Marina
 Aviazione Legionaria
 Italian Co-Belligerent Air Force

 Polish Air Force received 1 aircraft out of six ordered. This was destroyed during the German Invasion of Poland.
 – Nationalist Forces
 Spanish Nationalist Air Force

 Royal Air Force captured one aircraft which was briefly operated from Malta
Postwar

 Italian Air Force operated 37 aircraft until 1960 
 Aviazione Navale Italiana

Surviving aircraft
The only surviving CANT is a model Z.506 B, produced in 1941. Faithfully restored, it belongs to the 15th lot and has the construction number MM.45425. It was tested by Nicolò Lana on December 19, 1941, and registered with the number 84-4. It was delivered on January 12, 1942, and assigned to the 186ª Squadriglia, based in Agusta, Sicily, and carried out its first mission on January 12, 1942. It is exhibited at the Italian Air Force Museum (Museo Storico dell'Aeronautica), in Vigna di Valle, near Bracciano, north of Rome.

Specifications (Z.506B Series XII)

See also

References

Notes

Bibliography

 Angelucci, Enzo and Paolo Matricardi. World Aircraft: World War II, Volume I (Sampson Low Guides). Maidenhead, UK: Sampson Low, 1978. .
 Bignozzi, Giorgio. Aerei d'Italia . Milano, Edizioni E.C.A, 2000.
 Cull, Brian with Frederick Galea. 249 at Malta: Malta top-scoring Fighter Squadron 1941–1943. Malta: Wise Owl Publications, 2004. .
 De Marchi, Italo and Pietro Tonizzo. CANT. Z. 506 "airone"- CANT. Z. 1007 "alcione"  . Modena, Mucchi Editorr, 1997. NO ISBN.
  Green, William. War Planes of the Second World War: Volume Six – Floatplanes. London:Macdonald, 1962.
 Gunston, Bill. Gli aerei della seconda guerra mondiale . Milano, Alberto Peruzzo Editore, 1984.
 Mondey, David. The Hamlyn Concise Guide to Axis Aircraft of World War II. London: Bounty Books, 2006. .
 The Illustrated Encyclopedia of Aircraft (Part Work 1982–1985), 1985, Orbis Publishing

 The Complete Encyclopedia of World Aircraft. Donald, David, General Editor. London: Amber Books, 2001. .

External links

 CANT Z506

Z.0506
Floatplanes
1930s Italian patrol aircraft
Trimotors
Mid-wing aircraft
Aircraft first flown in 1935